The Canada Gairdner International Award is given annually by the Gairdner Foundation at a special dinner to five individuals for outstanding discoveries or contributions to medical science. Receipt of the Gairdner is traditionally considered a precursor to winning the Nobel Prize in Medicine; as of 2020, 95 Nobel Prizes have been awarded to prior Gairdner recipients. 

Canada Gairdner International Awards are given annually in the amount of $100,000 (each) payable in Canadian funds and can be awarded to residents of any country in the world. A joint award may be given for the same discovery or contribution to medical science, but in that case each awardee receives a full prize.

Past winners 

1959 Alfred Blalock, Harry M. Rose, William D.M. Paton, Eleanor Zaimis, Wilfred G. Bigelow
1960 Joshua Harold Burn, John H. Gibbon Jr., William F. Hamilton, John McMichael, Karl Meyer, Arnold Rice Rich
1961 Russell Brock, Alan C. Burton, Alexander B. Gutman, Jonas H. Kellgren, Ulf S. von Euler
1962 Francis H.C. Crick, Albert H. Coons, Clarence Crafoord, Henry G. Kunkel, Stanley J. Sarnoff
1963 Murray L. Barr, Jacques Genest, Irvine H. Page, Pierre Grabar, C. Walton Lillehei, Eric G.L. Bywaters
1964 Seymour Benzer,  Jr., Deborah Doniach, Ivan M. Roitt, Gordon D.W. Murray, Keith R. Porter
1965 Jerome W. Conn, Robin R.A. Coombs, Charles Enrique Dent, Charles P. Leblond, Frederick Horace Smirk
1966 Rodney R. Porter, Geoffrey S. Dawes, Charles B. Huggins, Willem J. Kolff, Luis F. Leloir, Jacques F.A.P. Miller, Jan Waldenström
1967 Christian DeDuve, Marshall W. Nirenberg, George E. Palade, Julius Axelrod, Sidney Udenfriend, D. Harold Copp, Iain Macintyre, J. Fraser Mustard
1968 Bruce Chown, James L. Gowans, George H. Hitchings, J. Edwin Seegmiller
1969 Frank J. Dixon, John P. Merrill, Belding H. Scribner, Robert B. Salter, Earl W. Sutherland, Ernest A. McCulloch, F. Mason Sones, James E. Till
1970 Vincent P. Dole, W. Richard S. Doll, Robert A. Good, Niels K. Jerne, Robert B. Merrifield
1971 Charles H. Best, Frederick Sanger, Donald F. Steiner, Solomon A. Berson, Rosalyn S. Yalow
1972 Sune Karl Bergström, Britton Chance, Oleh Hornykiewicz, Robert Russell Race, Ruth Sanger
1973 Roscoe O. Brady, Denis P. Burkitt, John Charnley, Kimishige Ishizaka, Teruko Ishizaka, Harold E. Johns
1974 David Baltimore, Howard M. Temin, Hector F. DeLuca, Roger Guillemin, Andrew V. Schally, Hans J. Müller-Eberhard, Juda Quastel
1975 Ernest Beutler, Baruch S. Blumberg, Henri G. Hers, Hugh E. Huxley, William Thornton Mustard
1976 Sir Godfrey N. Hounsfield, William B. Kannel, Eugene P. Kennedy, George Klein, George D. Snell
1977 , Cyril A. Clarke, Jean Dausset, Henry G. Friesen, Victor A. McKusick
1978 Sydney Brenner, Jean-Pierre Changeux, Donald S. Fredrickson, Samuel O. Freedman, Phil Gold, Edwin G. Krebs, Elizabeth C. Miller, James A. Miller (de), Lars Terenius (de)
1979 Sir James W. Black, George F. Cahill Jr., Walter Gilbert, Elwood V. Jensen, Frederick Sanger, Charles R. Scriver
1980 Paul Berg, H. Gobind Khorana, Efraim Racker, Jesse Roth, Michael Sela
1981 Michael S. Brown, Joseph L. Goldstein, Georges J. Köhler, César Milstein, Elizabeth F. Neufeld, Saul Roseman, Bengt Samuelsson
1982 Gilbert Ashwell, Günter Blobel, Arvid Carlsson, Paul Janssen, Manfred M. Mayer
1983 Donald A. Henderson, Bruce N. Ames, Gerald D. Aurbach, John A. Clements, Richard K. Gershon, Susumu Tonegawa
1984 J. Michael Bishop, Harold E. Varmus, Alfred G. Gilman, Martin Rodbell, Yuet Wai Kan, Kresimir Krnjevic, Robert L. Noble
1985 Stanley Cohen, Paul C. Lauterbur, Raymond U. Lemieux, Mary F. Lyon, Mark Ptashne, Charles Yanofsky
1986 Jean-Francois Borel, James E. Darnell, Philip A. Sharp, Adolfo J. de Bold, Peter C. Doherty, Rolf M. Zinkernagel, Michael Smith
1987 René G. Favaloro, Robert C. Gallo, Luc Montagnier, Walter J. Gehring, Edward B. Lewis, Eric R. Kandel, Michael G. Rossmann
1988 Albert J. Aguayo, Michael J. Berridge, Yasutomi Nishizuka, Thomas R. Cech, Michael A. Epstein, Robert J. Lefkowitz
1989 Mark M. Davis, Tak W. Mak, Louis M. Kunkel, Ronald G. Worton, Erwin Neher, Bert Sakmann
1990 Francis S. Collins, John R. Riordan, Lap-Chee Tsui, Victor Ling, Oliver Smithies, Edwin M. Southern, E. Donnall Thomas
1991 Sydney Brenner, John E. Sulston, M. Judah Folkman, Robert F. Furchgott, David H. MacLennan, Kary B. Mullis
1992 Leland H. Hartwell, Yoshio Masui, Paul M. Nurse, Richard Peto, Bert Vogelstein, Robert A. Weinberg
1993 Mario R. Capecchi, Oliver Smithies, Alvan Feinstein, Stanley B. Prusiner, Michel M. Ter-Pogossian
1994 Pamela J. Bjorkman, Don C. Wiley, Tony Hunter, Anthony J. Pawson, Donald Metcalf
1995 Bruce Alberts, Arthur Kornberg, Roger Y. Tsien , Peter Doherty
1996 Robert S. Langer, Barry J. Marshall, James E. Rothman, Randy W. Schekman, Janet Rowley
1997 , Erkki Ruoslahti, Richard O. Hynes, Alfred G. Knudson Jr.
1998 Elizabeth Blackburn, Carol W. Greider, Giuseppe Attardi, Gottfried Schatz
1999 Avram Hershko, Alexander J. Varshavsky, Robert Horvitz, Andrew Wyllie
2000 Jack Hirsh, Roger D. Kornberg, Robert G. Roeder, Alain Townsend, Emil Unanue
2001 Clay Armstrong, Bertil Hille, Roderick MacKinnon, Marc Kirschner
2002 Phil Green, Eric Lander, Maynard V. Olson, John E. Sulston, J. Craig Venter, Michael S. Waterman, Robert Waterston, Jean Weissenbach, Francis S. Collins (Award of Merit), James D. Watson (Award of Merit)
2003 Richard Axel, Linda B. Buck, Wayne Hendrickson, Seiji Ogawa, Ralph M. Steinman
2004 Seymour Benzer, R. John Ellis, F. Ulrich Hartl, Arthur L. Horwich, George Sachs
2005 Jeffrey M. Friedman, Douglas L. Coleman, Craig C. Mello, Andrew Z. Fire, Brenda Milner, Endel Tulving
2006 Ralph L. Brinster, Ronald M. Evans, Alan Hall, Thomas D. Pollard, Joan A. Steitz
2007 C. David Allis, Kim A. Nasmyth, Dennis J. Slamon, Harry F. Noller, Thomas A. Steitz
2008 Victor Ambros, Gary Ruvkun, Harald zur Hausen, Nahum Sonenberg, Samuel Weiss
2009 Peter Walter, Kazutoshi Mori, Lucy Shapiro, Richard Losick, Shinya Yamanaka
2010 William A. Catterall, Pierre Chambon, William G. Kaelin Jr., Peter J Ratcliffe, Gregg L. Semenza
2011 Adrian Peter Bird, Howard Cedar, Aharon Razin, Jules A. Hoffmann, Shizuo Akira
2012 Jeffrey C. Hall, Michael Rosbash, Michael W. Young, Thomas Jessell, Jeffrey V. Ravetch
2013 Harvey J. Alter, Daniel W. Bradley, Michael Houghton (award declined), Stephen Joseph Elledge, Gregory Winter
2014 James P. Allison, Titia de Lange, Marc Feldmann, Ravinder Nath Maini, Harold F. Dvorak, Napoleone Ferrara  
2015 Lewis C. Cantley, Michael N. Hall, Lynne E. Maquat, Yoshinori Ohsumi, Shimon Sakaguchi
2016 Feng Zhang, Jennifer Doudna, Emmanuelle Charpentier, Philippe Horvath, Rodolphe Barrangou
2017 Akira Endo, David Julius, Antoine Hakim, Lewis E. Kay, Rino Rappuoli, Huda Zoghbi
2018 Azim Surani, Davor Solter, Edward Boyden, Karl Deisseroth, Peter Hegemann
2019 John F. X. Diffley, Ronald Vale, Timothy A. Springer, Bruce Stillman, Susan Band Horwitz
2020 Roel Nusse, Rolf Kemler, Mina J. Bissell, Masatoshi Takeichi, Elaine Fuchs
2021 Daniel J. Drucker, Joel Francis Habener, Mary-Claire King
2022 Pieter Cullis, John Dick, Katalin Kariko, Drew Weissman, Stuart Orkin, Zulfiqar Bhutta

See also
 Canada Gairdner Global Health Award
 Canada Gairdner Wightman Award
 List of biomedical science awards

Notes and references

 

Biomedical awards
Canadian science and technology awards
Awards established in 1959